Nonstop! is the 51st studio album by American musician James Brown. The album was released in April 1981 and was compiled of outtakes from his previous album, T.K. Records' Soul Syndrome; the album thereby fulfilled his contract.

Track listing
All tracks composed by James Brown; except where indicated

References

1981 albums
James Brown albums
Albums produced by James Brown
Polydor Records albums